Crab jujube or hoi jo (Peng'im: hoi6 jo2; ,) is a Chinese dish from Chaozhou which contains a set of small deep-fried, jujube fruit-shaped, crab cakes. Its main ingredients are crab meat, pork fat (or ground pork belly), chopped water chestnuts, eggs, vegetables, and herbs, which are wrapped into a sheet of fresh tofu skin, forming long rolls, cut into bite-sized pieces, and deep-fried.

References

External links 
 crab jujube recipe - in Thai

Teochew cuisine
Thai cuisine